Basti Sadar is a constituency of the Uttar Pradesh Legislative Assembly covering the city of Basti in the Basti district of Uttar Pradesh, India.

Basti Sadar is one of five assembly constituencies in the Basti Lok Sabha constituency. Since 2008, this assembly constituency is numbered 310 amongst 403 constituencies.
Samajwadi Party candidate Mahendra Nath Yadav is MLA from this seat since 2022.

History 
Constituency known as "Basti" renamed in 2008 as "Basti Sadar"

Members of Legislative Assembly (MLAs)

Election results

2022

2017

16th Vidhan Sabha: 2012 General Elections

References

External links
 

Assembly constituencies of Uttar Pradesh
Basti, Uttar Pradesh